The 2010 Dutch Open was the 38th edition of the Dutch Open darts competition. Martin Adams won the tournament over fellow Englishman Scott Waites.

Draw

Dutch Open (darts)